New Hampshire v. Maine, 426 U.S. 363 (1977), was an original jurisdiction case in which the Supreme Court of the United States held that the boundary between the states of New Hampshire and Maine was fixed by the 1740 decree of King George II of Great Britain.  Both sides entered into a consent decree which was accepted by the special master appointed by the Court.

See also
Florida v. Georgia (1855)
Piscataqua River border dispute, New Hampshire v. Maine, No. 130 Original, 532 U.S. 742 (2001)
List of United States Supreme Court cases, volume 426
New Mexico v. Texas

References

External links
 

United States Supreme Court cases
United States Supreme Court cases of the Burger Court
Internal territorial disputes of the United States
United States Supreme Court original jurisdiction cases
1977 in United States case law
1977 in New Hampshire
1977 in Maine